Battle (Welsh: Y Batel) is a village in the community of Yscir, Powys, Wales, which is 36 miles (57 km) from Cardiff and 145 miles (234 km) from London. The Battle standing stone is an impressive Bronze Age monument and is 3.96m in height.

References

See also 
 List of localities in Wales by population

Villages in Powys